The Original Sins were a garage rock band that formed in 1987 in Bethlehem, Pennsylvania. The group were known for combining the musical stylings of punk rock, psychedelic rock, and even pop music with their songs. The band released a total of nine full-length studio albums across their entire career before they band broke up in early 1998.

On Friday, April 12, 2019 the band reunited to play at Johnny Brenda’s in Philadelphia, Pennsylvania.

History
The band emerged in 1987 from the edgy punk scene of Bethlehem, Pennsylvania.  The city was going through a major decline at the time due to the closing of the industrial powerhouse Bethlehem Steel. After numerous unsuccessful attempts at joining bands, guitarist John Terlesky decided to form his own band with Ken Bussiere, a bassist he met through Neil Hever, a WMUH college radio disc jockey who was friends with Terlesky. Later on, the duo would meet keyboardist Dan McKinney and drummer Dave Ferrara, and the quintet would name themselves The Original Sins.

Later that same year, the band released their debut studio album Big Soul, which received moderate success within the American underground music scene. Their independent success with Big Soul continued with The Hardest Way (1989) and Self Destruct (1990), the latter included a photo of Terlesky holding a BB gun next to his head as the cover. Their 1992 album, Move was expected to be a major success for the band, as Peter Buck from R.E.M. helped with the record, but unfortunately for the band, it was not.

After the release of Move, Ferrara left the group and would later perform in the band The Reach Around Radio Clowns. To replace him, the band hired Seth Baer on drum duties. Seth would stay with the band until he left for school before the production of Suburban Primitive, in which Ferrara came back to perform drums. The band would continue releasing records with Baer, such as Out There (1992) and Acidbubblepunk (1994). Their 1995 album Turn You On was released as a limited edition vinyl record through Terlesky's Bedlam record label.

1996 saw the release of Bethlehem, which was released through Bar/None Records, who released their debut album in 1987. The album shows a change in style and tone for the band, focusing much heavily on pop music rather than the garage punk fury of past releases. The album met high praise from fans and critics alike, with some calling it as "the band's greatest achievement". A year after the release of their 1997 album Suburban Primitive, the project finally ended after bassist and founder member Ken Bussiere announced that he will be moving to Florida to perform in oldies cover bands.

Members
John Terlesky - Vocals, guitar (1986 - 1998)
Ken Bussiere - Bass (1986 - 1998)
Dan McKinney - Organ, keyboards (1986 - 1998)
Dave Ferrara - Drums (1986 - 1992, 1997 - 1998)
Seth Baer - Drums (1992 - 1996)

Discography
Studio albums
Big Soul (1987, Bar/None)
The Hardest Way (1989, Psonik)
Self Destruct (1990, Psonik)
Move (1992, Psonik)
Out There (1992, Psonik)
Acidbubblepunk (1994, Psonik)
Turn You On (1995, Bedlam)
Bethlehem (1996, Bar/None)
Suburban Primitive (1997, Blood Red Vinyl & Discs)

EPs
Party's Over (1990, Dog Meat)
Eat This E.P. (1992, Psonik)
Sally Kirkland/Get Into It (1992, Psonik)
Afternoon Jam Session (1993, Radiation)
American Cheese Product 4 Slice (1996, Bedlam)

Singles
"Cross My Heart"
"Just 14"
"Coca-Cola"
"Nowhere To Go (From Here But Down)"
"Watch You Dance/Goin' Down"
"Alice D."
"Get You There/Come On Up"

Compilations
Skeletons In The Garage (1997, Spare Me)

References

External links
The Original Sins entry at Bar/None Records

Garage rock groups from Pennsylvania
Musical groups established in 1986
Punk rock groups from Pennsylvania